An outline of the participation of Panamanian football teams in the different regional tournaments offered by the CONCACAF. Since 1988, Panama has been sending at least one team to the competitions, the first appearance by a Panamanian team was in 1988 CONCACAF Champions' Cup when Plaza Amador played in the first round.

The best runs for a Panamanian team in competitions was when in 2002 when Árabe Unido finished runner-up in that year's competition of Copa Interclubes UNCAF.

Teams from Panama have participated in every edition of the CONCACAF Champions League (2008–present). The best results being runs to the quarterfinals on five separate occasions. Arabe Unido (x3: 2010, 2014, and 2017), Tauro FC (2018), and Indepediente (2019).

Panamanian teams have also competed in every edition of the CONCACAF League tournament which began in 2017 and ended in 2021. With four teams reaching the semifinals. Arabe Unido (x2 2017, and 2018), Plaza Amador (2017), and Tauro FC (2018).

Panamanian teams will compete in new CONCACAF Central American Cup which begins in 2023.

CONCACAF Champions Cup era

CONCACAF Champions League era (2008–present)

CONCACAF League (2017–2021) 

 
North American football clubs in international competitions